The AZAL 2014–15 season is AZAL's tenth Azerbaijan Premier League season. They will participate in the League and the Azerbaijan Cup. It will be their first full season with Tarlan Ahmadov as their manager.

Squad

Transfers

Summer

In:

Out:

Winter

In:

Out:

Friendlies

Competitions

Azerbaijan Premier League

Results summary

Results

League table

Azerbaijan Cup

Squad statistics

Appearances and goals

|-
|colspan="14"|Players who appeared for AZAL no longer at the club:

|}

Goal scorers

Disciplinary record

Notes
Qarabağ have played their home games at the Tofiq Bahramov Stadium since 1993 due to the ongoing situation in Quzanlı.
Araz-Naxçıvan were excluded from the Azerbaijan Premier League on 17 November 2014, with all their results being annulled.

References

External links 
 AZAL PFC Official Web Site
 AZAL PFC  at PFL.AZ
 AZAL PFC Official Facebook Page

AZAL
AZAL PFC seasons